Gonostomopsis is a genus of air-breathing land snails, terrestrial pulmonate gastropod mollusks in the subfamily Pleurodontinae of the family Pleurodontidae.

Genera
 Gonostomopsis auridens (Rang, 1834) (synonym: Helix auridens Rang, 1834, Pleurodonte auridens (Rang, 1834))

Description
The shell is narrowly umbilicated, rather thin, opaque, hirsute. The spire is depressed, body-whorl depressed, rounded at periphery. The Aperture is as high as wide and trilobate-lunar. The peristome is narrowly expanded, the outer and basal margins each with one tooth. Type P. auridens.

Distribution
This genus occurs in the Caribbean Sea off Martinique.

References

 A.A. SCHILEYKO (2006, Treatise on recent terrestrial pulmonate molluscs. Part 13. - Ruthenica, Supplement 2: 1765–1906);
 Bank, R. A. (2017). Classification of the Recent terrestrial Gastropoda of the World. Last update: July 16, 2017

External links
 MNHN, Paris: syntype
 Sei, Makiri & Robinson, David & Geneva, Anthony & Rosenberg, Gary. (2017). Doubled helix: Sagdoidea is the overlooked sister group of Helicoidea (Mollusca: Gastropoda: Pulmonata). Biological Journal of the Linnean Society. 1-32. 10.1093

Pleurodontidae